The Bermuda women's national volleyball team represents Bermuda in international women's volleyball competitions and friendly matches.

References

External links
Bermuda Volleyball Federation

National women's volleyball teams
Volleyball
Volleyball in Bermuda
Women's sport in Bermuda